NHL 2K, known in Europe as Sega Sports NHL 2K, is a video game developed by Black Box Games and published by Sega for Dreamcast in 2000.

Development
The game was in development for 12 months.

Reception

The game received favorable reviews according to the review aggregation website GameRankings. Evan Shamoon of Next Generation said, "If you're a hockey fan and [you] own a Dreamcast, you definitely need this game. Otherwise, you may want to wait 'til next year."

The game sold 140,000 copies.

References

External links
 

2000 video games
Sega video games
Dreamcast games
Dreamcast-only games
NHL 2K video games
Video games developed in Canada
Multiplayer and single-player video games